Pugo, officially the Municipality of Pugo, is a 5th class municipality in the province of La Union, Philippines. According to the 2020 census, it has a population of 19,337 people.

It is primarily an agricultural town.

History
The name of Pugo has its origin from Pangasinan, a language used in Pangasinan, a province south of La Union. Pugo as well as other parts of southern La Union was once part of the ethno-linguistic territory of Pangasinan-speaking people prior to political subdivision during the Spanish regime. Now, only a minority speaks Pangasinan in La Union mainly in the towns of Rosario and Santo Tomas. The term "Pugo" means "islet"; while Pugo itself is not an island, the term describes the huge rock beds in the Tapuacan River. The river also features rock walls and huge rocks which are now known as the Tapuakan Resort in Barangay Cares.

Geography

Barangays
Pugo is politically subdivided into barangays. These barangays are headed by elected officials: Barangay Captain, Barangay Council, whose members are called Barangay Councilors. All are elected every three years.

Climate

Demographics

Economy

Government
Just as the national government, the municipal government of Pugo is divided into three branches: executive, legislative, and judiciary. The judicial branch is administered solely by the Supreme Court of the Philippines. The LGUs have control of the executive and legislative branches.

The executive branch is composed of the mayor and the barangay captain for the barangays.Local Government Code of the Philippines, Book III, Department of the Interior and Local Government official website.

The legislative branch is composed of the Sangguniang Bayan (town assembly), Sangguniang Barangay (barangay council), and the Sangguniang Kabataan for the youth sector.

The seat of Government is vested upon the Mayor and other elected officers who hold office at the Pugo Town Hall. The Sangguniang Bayan is the center of legislation, stationed in Pugo Legislative Building.

Elected officials

Tourism

Nature and Man Made Adventure
With the opening of the PUGAD Pugo Adventure Park in Sitio Kagaling of Barangay Palina, the town now offers extreme adventure. It offers 3 Zip Lines with its famous 380 meters long 200 feet high Super Man Zip Line 1. It also has Swimming Pools, Cottages, Conference Halls, Hanging Bridge, Clean River, Rappeling Area, Wall Climbing, Ropping, ATV Rides, Paint Ball Area, Trekking, and view of the Water Falls.

10 minutes away from Pugad Pugo Adventure is the "Travellers Inn". It offers villas, rooms, and even water adventure parks.

Scenic spots in Pugo include Tapuakan Resort, the Nagbukel, and the hot springs of Cares. Tapuakan Resort features rest areas where the people can enjoy the natural slides of the river. It was recently awarded as the clearest inland body of water for 2008 making it for 2 consecutive years. It also has a hot spring where tourists and the Pugonians go often as they believe that the spring can heal certain skin and pulmonary diseases. Nagbukel is found at Barangay Ambangonan, and many people also go there despite its remote location.

PUGAD
PUGAD (bird's nest) is one of the recreation and adventure landmarks in Pugo. It is a picturesque site with 3 hectares of green forests, lush mountains, and a clean river. It is 300 meters away from Marcos Highway.
Zip Line Adventure - Pugo's Pugad has the longest zip line (380 meters) in Luzon, the second in the Philippines.

Tapuacan River
Tapuacan River (also known as Pugo - Cleanest Inland River of the North, Region I) is located in Barangay Cares (the smallest/inlet town which is situated at the foot of the Santo Tomas mountains range and about an hour away from Baguio passing through the Aspiras, formerly Marcos Highway leading to the Ilocandia Region). The natural scenery is also a 1-hour ride from San Fernando City and around 4–5 hours drive from Manila.

Kultura Splash Wave
Pugo's Kultura Splash Wave is a prime resort (Km. 21 Marcos Highway, Barangay Cares). It has attractions: Lap pool, Pool Kiddie, Dolphin pools, 4 Giant Slides with Dropzone, Water Factory, Aerial Zip Lines, Wall Climbing, Sky Walker.

Marcos bust
A  concrete Bust of Ferdinand Marcos built from 1978 to 1980 using government funds. The monument was controversial as the land used were grabbed from the indigenous Ibaloi people, who were against the Marcos conjugal dictatorship. The monument was built upon the orders of then incumbent President Ferdinand Marcos in a park that he named after himself. The park's land was also land-grabbed from the Ibaloi people. The monument was destroyed in December 2002 by treasure hunters. The destroyed bust is considered "a monument to evil, warning people never to become what this man was" for the future.

Holy Family Family Parish Church 
As of 2012, the 1909 Holy Family Family Parish Church of Pugo (canonically erected in 1909), celebrates its fiesta every Last Sunday of December. It is under the jurisdiction of the Roman Catholic Diocese of San Fernando de La Union (Dioecesis Ferdinandopolitana ab Unione, Suffragan of Lingayen – Dagupan, which was created on January 19, 1970, and erected on April 11, 1970, comprising the Civil Province of La Union, under the Titular, St. William the Hermit, February 10). The heritage church is under a diocese of the Latin Church of the Roman Catholic Church in the Philippines from the Archdiocese of Nueva Segovia. Its Parish Priest is Fr. Crispin N. Reyes.

The Pugo Church is under the Vicariate of St. Francis Xavier with Vicar Forane, Fr. Joel Angelo Licos. The Holy Family Parish was built in the year 1909-1911 by the Belgian Missionary for the people of Pugo, La Union.

Gallery

References

External links

 [ Philippine Standard Geographic Code]
Philippine Census Information
Local Governance Performance Management System

Municipalities of La Union